Mária Temesi (born 29 July 1957) is a Hungarian operatic soprano, university (full) professor, the head of Voice Department at the Faculty of Music at the University of Szeged.

Biography and career
She was born on 29 July 1957 in Szeged, Hungary. Her birth name was Mária Tóth.

Before her graduation she won the 4th prize at the International Maria Callas Grand Prix in Athens in 1979.

She took BA degree in music and piano teaching at the Franz Liszt College of Music at the Conservatory of Szeged in 1979 and M.A. degree in opera studies and in education in 1981 at the Franz Liszt Academy of Music, Budapest.

After her graduation she became the member of the Hungarian State Opera House in 1981.

She won the 1st prize at the Luciano Pavarotti International Voice Competition in Philadelphia in 1985.

She was appointed to the head of the department of the Voice Department as associate professor (docent, reader), and she has been acting as the chairman from 1997.

She was awarded Doctor of Liberal Arts (D.L.A.) degree in 2003 and then he received the title of university (full) professor.

She is a notable and respected artist both in Hungary and around the world and developed significant artistic and professional relationships.

She has been one of the founders of the József Simándy International Singing Competition from 1998.

Repertoire
 Sándor Szokolay: Ecce Homo....Lénió
 Wagner: Tannhäuser....Princess Elizabeth
 Wagner: Die Walküre....Sieglinde
 Verdi: Il trovatore....Leonora
 Verdi: Aida....Aida
 Wagner: Siegfried....Brünnhilde
 Wagner: The Flying Dutchman....Senta
 Wagner: Götterdämmerung....Brünnhilde
 Richard Strauss: Elektra....Chrysothemis
 Mascagni: Cavalleria rusticana....Santuzza
 Iván Madarász: Last waltz...Woman
 Puccini: Tosca....Floria Tosca
 Janáček: Jenůfa....Kostelnička Buryjovka
 Wagner: Lohengrin....Ortrud
 Giordano: Andrea Chénier....La comtesse di Coigny
 Strauss: Der Rosenkavalier....Marianne
 Mozart: Don Giovanni...Donna Anna
 Verdi: Don Carlos....Élisabeth de Valois
 Tchaikovsky: Eugene Onegin....Tatyana Larina
 Wagner: Die Meistersinger von Nürnberg....Eva
 Cilea: Adriana Lecouvreur....Adriana Lecouvreur

Discography
2004: Wagner Hősnők (Heroines) Hungaroton - Budapest
1999: Mozart: Requiem Bilkent University - Ankara
1996: Britten: Háborús rekviem (War Requiem) University of Zagreb
1990: Liszt: Hungaria 1848 Hungaroton - Budapest
1986: Liszt: Missa Choralis Hungaroton - Budapest
1984: Respighi: La fiamma (La Madre) Hungaroton - Budapest
1983: Mahler: Symphony No. 8 (Mater Gloriosa) Hungaroton - Budapest

Awards and honours
 The International Maria Callas Grand Prix, Athens - 4th prize (1979)
 International Singing Competition of Toulouse, Théâtre du Capitole - 3rd prize (1980)
 The Luciano Pavarotti International Voice Competition in Philadelphia - 1st prize (1985)
 Bartók–Pásztory prize (1992)
 Mihály Székely memorial plaquette (1995)
 Juventus Music Award (1996)
 Franz Liszt Prize (2000)
 Artisjus Award (2003)
 Order of Merit of the Republic of Hungary, Knight's Cross, 2016

References

1957 births
Academic staff of the University of Szeged
Hungarian sopranos
Living people
Hungarian women academics
20th-century Hungarian women
21st-century Hungarian women